Cavisternum is a genus of goblin spider. All its species are native to Australia.

Species
, the World Spider Catalog accepted the following species:
Cavisternum attenboroughi Baehr & Raven, 2013 – Australia (Northern Territory)
Cavisternum bagleyae Baehr, Harvey & Smith, 2010 – Australia (Queensland)
Cavisternum barthorum Baehr, Harvey & Smith, 2010 – Australia (Queensland)
Cavisternum bertmaini Baehr, Harvey & Smith, 2010 – Australia (Western Australia)
Cavisternum bom Ranasinghe & Benjamin, 2018 – Sri Lanka
Cavisternum carae Baehr, Harvey & Smith, 2010 – Australia (Northern Territory)
Cavisternum clavatum Baehr, Harvey & Smith, 2010 (type species) – Australia (Western Australia)
Cavisternum digweedi Baehr, Harvey & Smith, 2010 – Australia (Northern Territory)
Cavisternum ewani Baehr, Harvey & Smith, 2010 – Australia (Queensland)
Cavisternum federicae Baehr & Harvey, 2010 – Australia (Queensland)
Cavisternum foxae Baehr, Harvey & Smith, 2010 – Australia (Queensland)
Cavisternum gatangel Baehr, Harvey & Smith, 2010 – Australia (Queensland)
Cavisternum gillespieae Harvey & Baehr, 2013 – Australia (Northern Territory)
Cavisternum heywoodi Baehr, Harvey & Smith, 2010 – Australia (Queensland)
Cavisternum hughesi Baehr, Harvey & Smith, 2010 – Australia (Queensland)
Cavisternum ledereri Baehr, Harvey & Smith, 2010 – Australia (Queensland)
Cavisternum leichhardti Harvey & Baehr, 2013 – Australia (Northern Territory)
Cavisternum maxmoormanni Baehr, Harvey & Smith, 2010 – Australia (Northern Territory)
Cavisternum mayorum Baehr, Harvey & Smith, 2010 – Australia (Queensland)
Cavisternum michaelbellomoi Baehr, Harvey & Smith, 2010 – Australia (Queensland)
Cavisternum monteithi Baehr & Harvey, 2010 – Australia (Queensland)
Cavisternum noelashepherdae Baehr, Harvey & Smith, 2010 – Australia (Northern Territory)
Cavisternum rochesterae Baehr, Harvey & Smith, 2010 – Australia (Queensland)
Cavisternum toadshow Baehr, Harvey & Smith, 2010 – Australia (Queensland)
Cavisternum waldockae Baehr, Harvey & Smith, 2010 – Australia (Western Australia)

References

Oonopidae
Araneomorphae genera
Spiders of Australia